State of Saint Wenceslas, Prague may refer to:
 Statue of Saint Wenceslas (Bendl), Vyšehrad
 Statue of Saint Wenceslas, Wenceslas Square